"Lean Into It " is a song by American R&B singer Joe. It was written by Joe along with Brandon Hodge, Jolyon Skinner, Derek "D.O.A." Allen, Gerald Isaac, and Damien R. Farmer III for his twelfth studio album My Name Is Joe Thomas. Production was helmed by Farmer, Isaac and Allen. Released as the album's third single, it peaked at number 16 on the US Billboard Adult R&B Songs chart.

Charts

References

2017 singles
2016 songs
Joe (singer) songs
Songs written by Jolyon Skinner
Songs written by Joe (singer)